Penthetria is a genus of March flies (Bibionidae).

Species

References

Bibionidae
Nematocera genera
Taxa named by Johann Wilhelm Meigen